Missing Home is a 2022 Indonesian comedy-drama film directed by Bene Dion Rajagukguk. The film stars Arswendy Beningswara Nasution, Tika Panggabean, Boris Bokir Manullang, Gita Bhebita Butarbutar, Lolox and Indra Jegel. It tells the story of the parents of a Batak family that pretend to argue so their children can come back to them in time for a tradition.

The film was selected as the Indonesian entry for Best International Feature Film at the 95th Academy Awards.

Plot
Pak Domu and Mak Domu are parents of four children: Sarma, Sahat, Domu, and Gabe. Sarma lives with her parents, while her brothers live in other cities with their own careers. Missing the children and with a Batak Thanksgiving party coming up, the two want their children to come home, but are faced with dilemmas: Domu wants to marry a Sunda woman, who Pak Domu fears might not understand Batak culture, Gabe is a star of a comedy show despite Pak Domu choosing law as his major, and Sahat lives with and cares for a man named Pak Pomo after graduating university and refuses to go back home. Pak Domu and Mak Domu decide to start to pretend fighting and pretend that a divorce is imminent, causing the children to return to them for a temporary stay.

After an unsuccessful conversation at dinner, the children take both parents to Bukit Holbung and talk to each one of them while distracting the other. Pak Domu explains that he wants to be defended for raising the family, while Mak Domu claims that her husband is making her tired. Pak Domu's mother tell the children that she was aware of the situation, and recommends that they stay until the party is finished.

The family are able to partake in the Batak Thanksgiving party together, and the next day, Mak Domu is forced to rest due to a fever; Pak Domu uses this as an opportunity to scold his children for not following his wishes. The children, knowing that there might be no end to the situation, decide to return to their respective careers anyway. Pak Domu starts an argument that angers the children and Mak Domu, who, angry at his patriarchal ideology, inadvertently reveals that the divorce situation was fake the entire time. Sarma, who overheard their conversation about staging the divorce before the three children came home, breaks down in tears and explains about how she was always pressured to follow the family's orders. Mak Domu, now wanting a real divorce, leaves to her mother's house with Sarma, while Domu and Gabe return to their normal lives, leaving Sahat at the house.

Pak Domu meets with his mother and explains that he inherited his parenting style from his dad. His mother tells him that every family has a different parenting style and urges to accept the family's differences. After briefly meeting with Mak Domo, Pak Domo visits the children's workplaces. He learns that Domu's wife is able to understand Batak culture, Gabe's co-stars are understanding, and Pak Pomo explains that Sahat is a respected person in the village where he resides. Remembering Mak Domo's wishes, Pak Domo reunites the family at her mother's house, and, promising to return to their house together once more, eats lunch with the rest of his family.

The film ends with a Batak quote, which says, "Sititik ma sigompa, golang-golang pangarahutna. On ma na boi tarpatupa, sai godang ma pinasuna". The quote translates to "This is what we can present, may it bring many blessings".

Cast

Release
The film was theatrically released in Indonesia on 2 June 2022. The film garnered 2.8 million admission during its sixty four days theatrical run and it became the fourth highest-grossing Indonesian film of 2022 as of 27 October.

The film was globally distributed on streaming service Netflix on 6 October 2022.

Accolades

See also
 List of submissions to the 95th Academy Awards for Best International Feature Film
 List of Indonesian submissions for the Academy Award for Best International Feature Film

References

External links
 
2022 comedy-drama films
2020s Indonesian-language films
Films set in Sumatra
Indonesian comedy-drama films
Films about families